The Valsin Broussard House is a historic house located at 408 West Main Street in Broussard, Louisiana.

Built c.1876 by Valsin Broussard, founder of the town of Broussard, the house is the oldest remaining residence in the town. The Creole two-story frame house with a frontend gallery was modified in c.1900 with the addition of the rear wing.

The house was listed on the National Register of Historic Places on March 14, 1983.

It is one of 10 individually NRHP-listed houses in the "Broussard Multiple Resource Area", which also includes: 
Alesia House
Billeaud House 
Martial Billeaud Jr. House

Comeaux House 
Ducrest Building
Janin Store 
Roy-LeBlanc House 
St. Cecilia School 
St. Julien House 
Main Street Historic District

See also
 National Register of Historic Places listings in Lafayette Parish, Louisiana

References

Houses on the National Register of Historic Places in Louisiana
Houses completed in 1876
Lafayette Parish, Louisiana
National Register of Historic Places in Lafayette Parish, Louisiana